Sanj is a village in Baraghan Rural District, Chendar District, Savojbolagh County, Alborz Province, Iran. At the 2006 census, its population was 162, in 50 families.

References 

Populated places in Savojbolagh County